Khindas is a village in Bikaner district Rajasthan state of India.

Politics and governance
Khindasar village is administrated by a sarpanch (head of village),patasi devi is elected to 178 vote win

Demographics
Khindas is a small size village located in Degana of Nagaur district, Rajasthan with total 207 families residing. The Khindas village has population of 1061 of which 543 are males while 518 are females as per Population Census 2011.

In Khindas village population of children with age 0-6 is 148 which makes up 13.95% of total population of village. Average Sex Ratio of Khindas village is 954 which is higher than Rajasthan state average of 928. Child Sex Ratio for the Khindas as per census is 1085, higher than Rajasthan average of 888.

Khindas village has lower literacy rate compared to Rajasthan. In 2011, literacy rate of Khindas village was 63.53% compared to 66.11% of Rajasthan. In Khindas Male literacy stands at 74.79% while female literacy rate was 51.47%.

References

Villages in Nagaur district